Vadakku valliyur or Valliyur is a Special Grade Town Panchayat in Radhapuram taluk in Tirunelveli district in the Indian state of Tamil Nadu.Valliyur is one of the fastest-growing towns in Tirunelveli district. This town is located along  NH 7. It gets its name from the goddess Valli, consort of Lord Murugan. The place connects the big city of Tirunelveli to the city of Nagercoil and town of Kanyakumari on NH 7.

Once a shanty village with farmers and shepherds, the people of Valliyoor are known for their business acumen and high standard of education.  The beautiful Murugan Temple, the oceanic Valliyoor Kulam, the wide and appeasing Kuravan Malai (Western Ghats) gives the town a beautiful look and feel. Vallioor has old temples, churches and good Kalyanamandapams, bus station, schools of international standards, fire stations, vibrant transport system and much more. The place is also provided with good schools and staying facilities.

Thiru Subramaniyar Swami Kovil
This ancient Murugan temple is located at Vallioor, not far from Tirunelveli and Kanyakumari. It has been revered by the Tiruppukazh hymns of Arunagirinathar.

The presiding deity here is Subramaniyar, and the sanctum enshrines an image of Murugan with that of his consort Valli. The temple has a rock-cut sanctum carved out of a hill and several mandapams surrounding it. There are also shrines to Natarajar and Dakshinamūrti here. The Saravanapoikai tank is located adjacent to the hill. The diamond studded Vel held by Subramaniyar is of great beauty.

Legend has it that Indra and Agastyar worshipped Subramanyar here. Legend also has it that the Saravanapoikai tank was created when Murugan struck his spear to the ground, upon being requested by his consort.

Legend has it that this temple was first discovered by a Pandya king who came here on a hunting expedition after visiting the Perumal temple at Tirukkurunkudi and that the temple was expanded by his descendants. Vallioor was under the governance of Kulasekhara Pandyan of the 13th century, who fortified the village.

Festivals
Giri pradakshinam is considered to be of importance here as in Tiruvannamalai, Kunnakkudi and Palani. Seven worship services are carried out each day. Skanda Sashti is celebrated with great splendour here as are the float festival in the month of Karttikai and the annual festival in the month of Chittirai. Kodai in Sudlaimadan Temple is celebrated on the first Friday of Adi month and draws devotees from all over the World

Other places
The recent addition to Valliyur is the United Volunteer Service Society (UVSS) - New Life Home for Aged Destitutes. Located about  towards Eruvadi. This is a new initiative by like minded people and does not involve any specific religious group or Government or specific community.

It is the center city of the big cities, Tirunelveli and Nagercoil.  It takes half an hour from Vallioor to reach Kudankulam where the atomic power station is constructed now.

Meanwhile,  from the town is a place named Aralvaimozhi (en route to Nagercoil).  Between this stretch is present South Asia's largest wind power generation centre.  Since this place is good at climate conditions and near to the western ghats the wind power generation systems came into existence and the only one in India

Demography 
As per Census 2011, the population of Vadakku Valliyur Town Panchayat is 29,417. Female population of 14,883 outnumbers male population of 14,534. This population figures does not include the newly developed residential areas which do not come under the Town Panchayat limit

Transport facilities

Valliyur is well connected by road and rail network. It is located on NH 44, the longest running north- south highway of India, the four-lane express way provides good connectivity to Valliyur. Scheduled bus services are available to Tirunelveli, Nagercoil, Chennai, Madurai, Coimbatore, Thiruvananthapuram, Bengaluru and many other places. The Valliyur Railway station is located on the eastern part of the town provides train connections with Chennai, Bengaluru, Mumbai, Delhi, Howrah, etc.

Nearest airport is Thoothukkudi Airport, 75 km away.  Thiruvananthapuram International Airport, 120 km away, and Madurai International Airport, 200 km away, also serve the people of Valliyur.

Notable people
Ali Manikfan, Indian marine researcher
Alex Paul Menon, Indian civil servant
V. G. Panneerdas, Indian entrepreneur

List of village panchayats 

 Alanginar Thirumalapuram
 Achampadu
 Adangarkulam
 Anaikulam
 Avaraikulam
 Chettikulam
 Chidambarapuram-Yacobpuram
 Erukkanthurai
 Elayanainar kulam
 Kannanallur
 Kizhavaneri
 Kavalkinaru
 Kovankulam
 Levinchipuram
 Maddappuram
 Moolaikadu
 Nambiyanvillai
 Pazhavoor
 Puthur
 Thanakkarkulam
 Therkku Karunkulam-sanganapuram
 Therkku Valliyoor_
 Vadakkankulam
 Veppilankulam
Zion Malai

Ambalavanapuram

References

External links

Cities and towns in Tirunelveli district